ArtX was a company formed in 1997 by a group of twenty former Silicon Graphics, Inc. engineers, who had worked on the Nintendo 64's graphics chip. The company was focused on delivering a PC graphics chip that was both high performance and cost effective, and hoped to be able to instantly compete with then-dominant 3dfx and other fledgling competitors such as nVidia.

ArtX was led by Dr. Wei Yen, who had been SGI's head of Nintendo Operations, the department responsible for the Nintendo 64's fundamental design. David Orton, who was head of the advanced graphics division of Silicon Graphics, was appointed President of ArtX.

History
In late 1997, SGI filed a non-compete lawsuit against ArtX, claiming that the startup's staff of high level SGI alumni would be utilizing SGI's trade secrets.  This lawsuit was quietly dropped in 1998.

ArtX was contracted in May 1998 to create the system logic and the graphics processor (code named Flipper) for Nintendo's fourth game console (code named "Dolphin"), which would eventually be launched as the GameCube. Nintendo's Howard Lincoln said, "This company is headed up by Dr. Wei Yen, -- the man who was primarily responsible for the N64 graphics chip.  Dr. Yen has assembled at ArtX one of the best teams of 3D graphics engineers on the planet."

They demonstrated their first integrated graphics chipset with a built-in geometry engine at COMDEX in the fall of 1999. It was built into the Aladdin 7 northbridge sold by ALi of Taiwan.

ArtX was acquired by ATI Technologies, Inc. in February 2000 for $400 million in stock options. An ATI spokesperson said, "ATI now becomes a major supplier to the game console market via Nintendo. The Dolphin platform is reputed to be king of the hill in terms of graphics and video performance with 128-bit architecture." ArtX paved the way for the development of ATI's R300 graphics processor (Radeon 9700) released in 2002 which formed the basis of ATI's consumer and professional products for three years afterward.

References 

American companies established in 1997
American companies disestablished in 2000
Computer companies established in 1997
Computer companies disestablished in 2000
Defunct computer hardware companies
Defunct computer companies of the United States
Graphics hardware companies